Dance House Children was the early 1990s musical group of Ronnie Martin and Jason Martin that was the precursor to The Brothers Martin. In the liner notes of Jesus, Ronnie described its music as trendy, club-oriented music. The group was signed to the Blonde Vinyl label and released two albums, Songs & Stories (1991) and Jesus (1992). Jesus was rereleased by Millennium Eight Records for a limited time.

The band was originally named "Love Children," but the label's founder, Michael Knott didn't like the name and suggested "Dance House Jesus" instead. The brothers ended up combining both names, while the leftover Jesus became the name of their second effort. Like in those by The Brothers Martin, Dance House Children songs were composed by both Ronnie and Jason, while vocals were performed individually, as opposed to in duets.

Ronnie later released Rainbow Rider: Beautiful Dazzling Music No. 1, which was created with friends Tom Danielson and Jeff Cloud. Many fans mistake "Rainbow Rider" as a separate band or music project. It foreshadowed the synthpop slant that would be dominant in Joy Electric, while retaining the "techno" elements of previous albums. His sister Amy is often mistaken as a major contributor to Rainbow Rider, though she only appeared in a photo inside of the album.  (One source claims that she played a Moog Prodigy for the album and another claims that she "assisted" in its production.)

See also

The Brothers Martin

Discography
 Jesus
 Songs & Stories
 Rainbow Rider

References

Further reading
 
 

American electronic music groups